"Meds" is a song by English alternative rock band Placebo, released on 9 October 2006 as the fourth single from their fifth studio album Meds.

Content 
The song features vocals from Alison "VV" Mosshart of The Kills.

The cover art features a collage of the band members blurred faces. All three faces were featured individually on the previous three singles released for the album.

Release 
"Meds" was released on 9 October 2006 in both vinyl and CD format. The song was released to alternative rock radio airplay in the U.S. in late 2006. Its airplay increased gradually, so that by early January 2007, it was one of the 50 most-played songs on U.S. alternative radio. The single reached number 35 on the UK Singles Chart.

Track listing 
 CD 1
 "Meds (Single Mix)" (feat. Alison Mosshart)
 "Lazarus"

 CD 2
 "Meds (Single Mix)"
 "UNEEDMEMORETHANINEEDU"
 "Space Monkey (Timo Maas Remix)"
 "Meds" (video)

 7" vinyl
 "Meds (Single Mix)"
 "UNEEDMEMORETHANINEEDU"

Charts

References

External links 
 
 Lyrics of this song - Meds

2006 singles
2006 songs
Placebo (band) songs
Virgin Records singles
Song recordings produced by Dimitri Tikovoï
Songs written by Steve Hewitt
Songs written by Brian Molko
Songs written by Stefan Olsdal